The Herbert screw (invented by Timothy Herbert) is a variable pitch cannulated screw typically made from titanium for its biocompatible properties as the screw is normally intended to remain in the patient indefinitely. It became generally available in 1978. It is one of the earliest designs of headless compression screws which are used to achieve interfragmentary compression through its differential pitch between the threads at each end of the screw(distance between adjacent threads of screw).

It is used in scaphoid, capitellum, radial head and in osteochondral fractures. Other uses include osteochondritis dissecans & small joint arthrodesis.

References

Orthopedic screws